Muhammad ibn Shaddad was the Kurdish founder and first ruler of the Shaddadid dynasty. He captured Dvin from the Sallarids in 951, although apparently the citadel remained in the hands of a Daylamite garrison loyal to the Sallarids. He managed to maintain his control until 954, when the Sallarids retook the town. Muhammad, his family and his supporters fled to Vaspurakan, where he died in 955.

Sources
 
 
 

955 deaths
History of Dvin
Shaddadids
10th century in Armenia
10th-century Kurdish people